HMGA is a family of high mobility group proteins characterized by an AT-hook. They code for a "small, nonhistone, chromatin-associated protein that has no intrinsic transcriptional activity but can modulate transcription by altering the chromatin architecture". Mammals have two orthologs: HMGA1 and HMGA2.

Genomic distribution
In mouse embryonic stem cells it has been demonstrated that both HMGA proteins binds uniformly to the DNA due to their AT-hook domains, with a slight preference for AT-rich regions/ Such regions tend to lack coding genes, an observation that argues against a direct role in transcriptional control and in agreement with previous studies, suggest that these proteins have a structural role in the chromatin, similar to histone.

Association with human traits
Variations in HMGA2 to have a moderate association with adult height.

See also 
 HMGA1
 HMGA2

References

External links 
 

Transcription factors